Robert Arteaga (born 10 February 1973) is a Bolivian footballer. He played in three matches for the Bolivia national football team from 1994 to 1995. He was also part of Bolivia's squad for the 1995 Copa América tournament.

References

External links
 

1973 births
Living people
Bolivian footballers
Bolivia international footballers
Association football midfielders
Sportspeople from Santa Cruz de la Sierra